This is a list of constituency wise results of 2021 West Bengal Legislative Assembly election.

Constituency Wise Results

Notes

References

External links
 West Bengal General Legislative Election at the Election Commission of India

2021 West Bengal Legislative Assembly election
West Bangal
2021
2020s in West Bengal